Croseus Peak at  above sea level is a peak in the White Cloud Mountains of Idaho. The peak is located in Sawtooth National Recreation Area in Custer County.

References 

Mountains of Custer County, Idaho
Mountains of Idaho
Sawtooth National Forest